The John Cretsinger House is a historic building located south of Coon Rapids, Iowa, United States. Benjamin and Joseph Tuttle came from Hancock County, Illinois and built this structure in 1853. John Cretsinger built the lean-to kitchen sometime after 1867. The cabin is located on a north slope surrounded by timber. It is a rare example of an original log cabin in western Iowa. The house was listed on the National Register of Historic Places in 1998.

References

Houses completed in 1853
Buildings and structures in Guthrie County, Iowa
Houses on the National Register of Historic Places in Iowa
Log cabins in the United States
National Register of Historic Places in Guthrie County, Iowa
Log buildings and structures on the National Register of Historic Places in Iowa